Nicholas Marsicano (1908 – 1991) was an American painter and teacher of the New York School. His work was primarily based on the female figure.

Life
Marsicano was born October 1, 1908, in Shenandoah, Pennsylvania. He was educated at the Pennsylvania Academy of the Fine Arts, Philadelphia, and later was accepted at the nearby Barnes Foundation, along with Ralston Crawford.  During his years at the Barnes, Marsicano traveled to Europe and North Africa, Mexico, and United States.

Marsicano befriended many artists of his time including Mark Rothko, Jackson Pollock, Franz Kline, Raoul Hague, Phillip Guston, and others.

During his teaching career, his students included Tom Wesselmann, Eva Hesse, Audrey Flack, Milton Glaser, Joan Semmel, Mel Leipzig, Thomas Nozkowski, and more.

He was awarded a Guggenheim Fellowship in 1974.

Marsicano was married to the dancer and choreographer Merle Marsicano. He later married Susan Marsicano.

He died at his home in Woodstock, New York, on January 6, 1991, at the age of 82.

Major shows
1960-62 Whitney Museum of American Art Annuale, New York
1962 Recent Painting U.S.A.: The Figure, May 23–Aug 26, The Museum of Modern Art, New York
1961-63 "Abstract American Drawings and Watercolors", The Museum of Modern Art, New York

Major collections
Amarillo Museum of Art
The Art Institute, Chicago
Kresge Art Museum, Michigan State University, East Lansing, Michigan
The Figge Art Museum, Davenport, Iowa
General Services Administration; Washington, DC.

Teaching
Cooper Union
Yale University
University of Michigan
Brooklyn Museum School
Pratt Institute
Cornell University
Silvermine College of Fine Arts
Davenport Municipal Art Gallery, Iowa
State University of New York at Purchase

References

 Marika Herskovic, New York School Abstract Expressionists Artists Choice by Artists, (New York School Press, 2000.) . p. 31; p. 37;
 MoMA,

See also
Art movement
Abstract expressionism
New York School
American Figurative Expressionism
New York Figurative Expressionism
Stable Gallery

1908 births
1991 deaths
Cooper Union faculty
Yale University faculty
Pratt Institute faculty
State University of New York at Purchase faculty
Cornell University faculty
Abstract expressionist artists
Expressionist painters
20th-century American painters
American male painters
Artists from New York (state)
People from Shenandoah, Pennsylvania